Created Equal may refer to:

Created Equal, a 1982 episode from Voyagers!
JLA: Created Equal, a comic book series
Created Equal (film), a 2017 film directed by Bill Duke

See also
All men are created equal, a phrase from the U.S. Declaration of Independence